Haraldstad is a Norwegian surname. Notable people with the surname include:

Kjetil-Vidar Haraldstad (born 1973), Norwegian black metal drummer
Magne Haraldstad (1937–2008), Norwegian politician

Norwegian-language surnames